Alexander Simon "Alex" Rendell (born January 9, 1990) or Nirawit Rendell, is a Thai actor and singer who has starred in films such as The Tesseract (2003), Indiana Joai: Elephant Cemetery (2003), Pisaj (2004) and 13 Beloved (2006). He is of English and Thai descent.

Life 
He was born in Jakarta, Indonesia and moved back to Bangkok, Thailand when he was 4 years old. Rendell began his acting career aged 4. Rendell graduated from Bangkok Patana School in 2008, and attended Faculty of Communication Arts, International Program, Chulalongkorn University. He graduated in 2012 and has diverted his full attention to series/movies.

Rendell enjoys playing football and supports Manchester United. He has played for his Highschool - Bangkok Patana and helped clinch multiple BISAC & SEASAC trophies. An interesting fact to point out is that his favourite number is 22 and he is part of PUAKKUA since 1993/1994 till present.

Discography

ost 
 เพลง "แพ้อากาศ"  ในอัลบั้ม'' คอนเวอร์เจนซ์เลิฟวัน
 เพลง "นกไม่เห็นฟ้า ปลาไม่เห็นน้ำ"
 เพลง "หากฉันรู้" ประกอบละคร  อาคม

Concerts

Filmography

Film

Television Dramas

Awards 
 Golden Television Award No. 28 Outstanding Male Supporting Actress From the drama Samee
 The 5th Dance Award Best Supporting Actor From the drama Samee
 Nine Entertainment Awards 2014 Male Actor of the Year From the drama Samee
 Entering the prize Kom Chad Lueu Award 11 Best Supporting Actor From the drama Samee
 M Thai Top Talk 2016, the most talked about male branch

References

External links

 alexrendell.com
 

1990 births
Living people
People from Jakarta
Alexander Rendell
Alexander Rendell
Alexander Rendell
Alexander Rendell
Alexander Rendell
Alexander Rendell
Alexander Rendell